In geometry, the square orthobicupola is one of the Johnson solids. As the name suggests, it can be constructed by joining two square cupolae along their octagonal bases, matching like faces. A 45-degree rotation of one cupola before the joining yields a square gyrobicupola.

The square orthobicupola is the second in an infinite set of orthobicupolae.

The square orthobicupola can be elongated by the insertion of an octagonal prism between its two cupolae to yield a rhombicuboctahedron, or collapsed by the removal of an irregular hexagonal prism to yield an elongated square dipyramid, which itself is merely an elongated octahedron.

It can be constructed from the disphenocingulum by replacing the band of up-and-down triangles by a band of rectangles, while fixing two opposite sphenos.

Related polyhedra and honeycombs
The square orthobicupola forms space-filling honeycombs with tetrahedra; with cubes and cuboctahedra; with tetrahedra and cubes; with square pyramids, tetrahedra and various combinations of cubes, elongated square pyramids and/or elongated square bipyramids.

References

External links
 

Johnson solids